Vrh pri Površju is a settlement west of Raka in the Municipality of Krško in eastern Slovenia. The area is part of the traditional region of Lower Carniola. It is now included with the rest of the municipality in the Lower Sava Statistical Region.

Name
The name of the settlement was changed from Vrh to Vrh pri Površju in 1953.

Church
The local church is dedicated to Saint Agnes and belongs to the Parish of Raka. It is a Baroque church, built in the 18th century. Its belfry was built in 1809.

References

External links
Vrh pri Površju on Geopedia

Populated places in the Municipality of Krško